Lukman Murad (Arabic: لقمان مراد; born 5 June 1996 in Syria) is a Swedish footballer.

Career
From 2017 to 2018, Murad played professionally for Jordanian top flight side That Ras Club.

For 2019, he signed for Malkiya Club in Bahrain due to finding it difficult to reach the top 2 divisions in Sweden from the lower leagues. 

He is eligibile to represent Syria internationally.

References

External links
 
 Lukman Murad at Lagstatistik

Living people
1996 births
Swedish footballers
Association football wingers
Association football forwards
Association football midfielders
People from Qamishli
BK Forward players
Syrianska IF Kerburan players
Syrian emigrants to Sweden